Manfred Gräber is an Italian luger who competed during the late 1980s and 1990s. A natural track luger, he won two medals in the men's doubles event at the FIL World Luge Natural Track Championships with a gold in 1994 and a silver in  1998.

Gräber found better success at the FIL European Luge Natural Track Championships where he won five medals. This included four medals in singles (gold: 1987, 1995; silver: 1997, bronze: 1989) and one in doubles (silver: 1989).

References
Natural track European Championships results 1970-2006.
Natural track World Championships results: 1979-2007

Italian lugers
Italian male lugers
Living people
Year of birth missing (living people)
Sportspeople from Bruneck